The Curaçao national football team (Papiamentu: Selekshon di Futbòl Kòrsou) represents Curaçao in International football and is controlled by the Curaçao Football Federation (Federashon Futbòl Kòrsou; FFK).

Following a constitutional change that allowed its predecessor, the Colony of Curaçao and Dependencies to become a unified constituent country consisting of several island territories as the Netherlands Antilles and its dissolution in 2010, Curaçao has played under a new constitutional status as a separate constituent country since 2011.

Both FIFA and CONCACAF recognize the Curaçao national team to be the direct and sole successor of the dependant Curaçao (1921–1958) and the Netherlands Antilles national football teams.

History

The first national football team to bear the name Curaçao was the Territory of Curaçao national football team, which made its debut in 1924 in an away match against neighboring Aruba, a match which the Territory of Curaçao won four to nil.

In December 1954, the territory of Curaçao became the Netherlands Antilles, and following a constitutional change  the Netherlands Antilles were designated a  country within the Kingdom of the Netherlands, which included the islands of Aruba, Bonaire, Saba, Sint Eustatius and Sint Maarten. The name of the Curaçao team changed to Netherlands Antilles national team, representing all six islands.

In 1986, Aruba became a country within the Kingdom in its own right, with its own Aruba national team and subsequently Aruban players no longer represented the Netherlands Antilles.

On 10 October 2010, the Netherlands Antilles were dissolved, and Curaçao and Sint Maarten became countries in their own right, while Bonaire, Saba and Sint Eustatius became part of the Netherlands proper. Although not a sovereign state, Curaçao (the largest island territory in the Netherlands Antilles) appeared on the FIFA member list in March 2011, as successor of the Netherlands Antilles.

As well as taking on the Netherlands Antilles' FIFA membership, Curaçao was recognised as the direct successor of the former (similarly to how Serbia is regarded the direct successor of Yugoslavia, and Russia for the Soviet Union), and took on its historical records and FIFA ranking.

They played their first match as the newly formed Curaçao national team on 20 August 2011 against Dominican Republic at the Estadio Panamericano, with the match ending in a 1–0 loss for Curaçao.

During the CONCACAF Qualification for the 2018 FIFA World Cup, Curaçao achieved a major feat when they defeated Cuba 1–1 with the away goals rule.

After a strong qualification campaign, Curaçao defeated host Martinique in the semi finals of the 2017 edition of the Caribbean Cup with the score of 2–1. They met defending champions and six-time winners, Jamaica. Curaçao won their first ever Caribbean Cup by defeating Jamaica, again with the scoreline of 2–1.

Recent results and forthcoming fixtures

The following is a list of match results in the last 12 months, as well as any future matches that have been scheduled.

2022

2023

Coaching staff

Coaching history
Caretaker manager are listed in italics.

 Manuel Bilches (2011–12)
 Ludwig Alberto (2012–14)
 Igemar Pieternella (2014)
 Etienne Siliee (2014–15)
 Patrick Kluivert (2015–16)
 Remko Bicentini (2016–20)
 Guus Hiddink (2020–21)
 Patrick Kluivert (2021)
 Art Langeler (2022)
 Remko Bicentini (2022–present)

Players

Current squad

The following 24 players were called up for the Nations League match against Canada and the friendly against Argentina on 25 and 28 March 2023, respectively.

Caps and goals as of 26 November 2022, after the match against Suriname.

Recent call-ups
The following players have been called up for the team in the last twelve months.

RET Player retired from the national team.
SUS Player is serving suspension.
INJ Player withdrew from the squad due to an injury.
PRE Preliminary squad.
WD Player withdrew from the squad due to non-injury issue.
Notes:
 Caps do not include matches played for the former Netherlands Antilles, but solely appearances for the thereout subsequent country of Curaçao.

Player records

Players in bold are still active with Curaçao.

Most appearances

Most goals

Competitive record
All competitive matches played from 1921 to 1958 were contested as the Territory of Curaçao (comprising all six islands of the Netherlands Antilles). From 1958 to 2010 all matches were contested as the Netherlands Antilles, successor of the Territory of Curaçao, (still comprising six islands until 1986, when Aruba seceded). All competitive fixtures after 2010 were contested by Curaçao, which solely consists of the island nation itself. Under the newly formed governing body, Curaçao have so far only competed in 2014, 2018 and 2022 FIFA World Cup qualification, 2012 Caribbean Cup qualification, the 2014 and 2017 Caribbean Cup, the 2017 CONCACAF Gold Cup, 2019 CONCACAF Gold Cup, and the ABCS Tournament.

FIFA World Cup

*Draws include knockout matches decided on penalty kicks.

CONCACAF Gold Cup

*Draws include knockout matches decided on penalty kicks.

CONCACAF Nations League

*Draws include knockout matches decided on penalty kicks.

CFU Caribbean Cup

*Draws include knockout matches decided on penalty kicks.

ABCS Tournament

*Draws include knockout matches decided on penalty kicks.

All-time record against other nations
As of 9 October 2021

Netherlands Antilles (1946–2011)
The following matches were played as the Netherlands Antilles (from 16 December 1946 until 18 August 2011)

Curaçao (2011–present)
The following matches were played as Curaçao (from 18 August 2011 until present)

Team records

Wins
 Largest win 
15–0  vs  on 7 January 19591
 Largest win at the CONCACAF Championship finals 
4–1 vs  Honduras on 7 April 1963, 1963 CONCACAF Championship1
 Largest win at the CCCF Championship finals 
9–1 vs  Nicaragua on 15 May 1941, 1941 CCCF Championship
8–0 vs  Nicaragua on 11 March 1953, 1953 CCCF Championship
 Largest win at the CFU Championship finals 
Did not qualify
 Largest win at the Caribbean Cup finals 
2–1 vs  Martinique on 22 June 2017, 2017 Caribbean Cup
2–1 vs  Jamaica on 25 June 2017, 2017 Caribbean Cup
 Largest win at the Pan American Games 
3–1 vs  Venezuela on 22 March 1955, 1955 Pan American Games1
 Largest win at the ABCS Tournament 
9–2 vs  Bonaire on 15 July 2012, ABCS Tournament 2012

Draws
 Highest scoring draw 
3–3 vs  Panama on 8 May 1941
3–3 vs  Honduras on 27 February 19601
3–3 vs  Suriname on 2 March 19981
 Highest scoring draw at the CONCACAF Championship finals 
2–2 vs  Mexico on 4 December 1969, 1969 CONCACAF Championship1
2–2 vs  Guatemala on 5 December 1973, 1973 CONCACAF Championship1
2–2 vs  Honduras on 12 December 1973, 1973 CONCACAF Championship1
 Highest scoring draw at the CCCF Championship finals 
3–3 vs  Panama on 8 May 1941, 1941 CCCF Championship
3–3 vs  Honduras on 27 February 1960, 1960 CCCF Championship1
 Highest scoring draw at the CFU Championship finals 
Did not qualify
 Highest scoring draw at the Caribbean Cup finals 
1–1 vs  Saint Vincent and the Grenadines on 2 July 1989, 1989 Caribbean Cup1
1–1 vs  Grenada on 6 July 1989, 1989 Caribbean Cup1
 Highest scoring draw at the Pan American Games 
None
 Highest scoring draw at the ABCS Tournament 
n/aa
a. Tournament follows a knock-out format, and matches cannot end on a draw.

Defeats
 Largest defeat
8–0 vs  Netherlands on 5 September 19621
8–0 vs  Mexico on 8 December 19731
 Largest defeat at the CONCACAF Championship finals  8–0 vs  on 8 December 1973, 1973 CONCACAF Championship1
 Largest defeat at the CCCF Championship finals 
6–2 vs  Costa Rica on 13 May 1941, 1941 CCCF Championship
 Largest defeat at the CFU Championship finals 
Did not qualify
 Largest defeat at the Caribbean Cup finals 
4–0 vs  Haiti on 22 July 1998, 1998 Caribbean Cup1
 Largest defeat at the Pan American Games 
4–2 vs  Argentina on 13 March 1955, 1955 Pan American Games1
 Largest defeat at the ABCS Tournament 
3–1 vs  Bonaire on 2 December 2011, ABCS Tournament 2011
3–1 vs  Suriname on 16 November 2013, ABCS Tournament 2013
2–0 vs  Suriname on 4 December 2011, ABCS Tournament 2011

1. Matches played as the Netherlands Antilles from 16 December 1946 to 18 August 2011.

Honours
Major competitions

 CONCACAF Championship & Gold Cup:
 Third place (2): 19631, 19691

Minor competitions

 CFU Caribbean Cup:
 Champions (1): 2017
 Central American and Caribbean Games:
 Champions (2): 19501, 19621
 ABCS Tournament:
 Champions (2): 2021, 2022
 Runners-up (2): 2010, 2013
 Third place (2): 2012, 2015
 Four-Nations Tournament
 Champions (1): 1944
 Phillip Seaga Cup : Champions (1): 19631
 Inter Expo Cup / Polar Cup: Champions (1): 20041
 Runners-up (2): 20061, 20081
 Parbo Bier Cup: Champions (1): 20041
 King's Cup: Champions (1):''' 2019

1. Trophies won as the Netherlands Antilles from 16 December 1946 to 18 August 2011.

See also
Territory of Curaçao national football team (1921–1958)
Netherlands Antilles national football team (1958–2010)
Aruba national football team
Bonaire national football team
Sint Maarten national football team
Netherlands national football team

References

External links
 
 Curaçao United Fan site
 Curaçao at the FIFA website.

 
Caribbean national association football teams
Football in Curaçao